Daphnella effusa is a species of sea snail, a marine gastropod mollusc in the family Raphitomidae.

Description
The length of the shell attains 15.5 mm, its diameter 5.5 mm.

The graceful, reddish brown shell is much effused. The whorls are narrow and elongate. The sutures are impressed. The shell is spirally striate, decussated by growth lines. The outer lip is thin and scarcely sinuate.

The species was described from a single broken specimen. The holotype has not been found.

Distribution
This marine species was found in the Pacific Ocean off Neeah Bay, Washington, USA.

References

External links
 
  Philip P. Carpenter "IV.—Diagnoses of new forms of Mollusca from the Vancouver district"

effusa
Gastropods described in 1865